The Piria Palace (Spanish: Palacio Piria) is the headquarters of the Supreme Court of Uruguay. Located on the south side of the Plaza de Cagancha in Montevideo, on the Human Rights Passage, it was declared a National Historical Monument in 1975. In front of its main entrance is the Monument to Justice, a work by Rafael Lorente Mourelle.

History 
The construction of the building was projected by the Uruguayan businessman and philanthropist Francisco Piria in 1917 as a family residence. The design was carried out by the French architect Camille Gardelle, a former student of the Beaux-Arts de Paris. Piria resided in the building until his death in 1933.

In 1943, then president-elect Juan José de Amézaga leased the property as his private residence. On January 5, 1954, through Law No. 12,090, the Palacio Piria was acquired by the Uruguayan State, and destined to house the Supreme Court of Justice. On the occasion of Heritage Day, the palace opens its doors to be visited by the public.

Gallery

See also 

 Legislative Palace of Uruguay
 Executive Tower, Montevideo
 Salvo Palace, Montevideo

References

External links

Universitad ORT Facultad de Arquitectura
Intendencia Municipal de Montevideo - Palacio Piria

Palaces in Montevideo
Centro, Montevideo
1910s establishments in Uruguay